Doctor Who Extra is a documentary series created by the BBC as a complement to the long-running British science fiction television series Doctor Who.

Series 1 and "Last Christmas" were made for release on BBC iPlayer on Saturdays, immediately after the broadcast of the weekly television episode on BBC One, and were also available on the BBC Red Button service and the BBC YouTube channel, in addition to its Australian broadcast on ABC2 the following Saturday.

Series 2 was initially released online as clips on the BBC YouTube channel after the broadcast of the weekly television episode on BBC One. Although carrying the Extra name, they differ in content and presentation. They continue in the same format as Series 1 on home media releases as extras.

Doctor Who Extra was not continued with the tenth series of the program, and was replaced by Doctor Who: The Fan Show. Home media releases for the series also include an "Inside Look" into each of the episodes, episodic features that will include behind the scenes footage, cast interviews and the inside story. However, full-length episodes of Doctor Who Extra accompanied Christmas specials "The Return of Doctor Mysterio" and "Twice Upon a Time" in their home media releases.

Episodes

Series 1 (2014)
Doctor Who: Series 8 (2014)

Series 2 (2015)
Doctor Who: Series 9 (2015)

Online

Home media

Series 3 (2017)
Doctor Who: Series 10 (2017)

References

External links

 
 
 

2010s British documentary television series
2014 British television series debuts
2017 British television series endings
BBC Television shows
Doctor Who spin-offs
English-language television shows
Works about Doctor Who